This is a list of men's Hungarian athletics champions. The Hungarian Athletics Championships ( are held in an outdoor athletic field. The national championships are also trials for the Summer Olympics, World Championships and European Championships.

Champions

100 metres

 100 yards
1896: Alajos Szokolyi, MAC
1897: Pál Koppán, MUE
1898: István Záborszky, MAC
1899: Ernő Schubert, MUE
1900: Ernő Schubert , MUE
1901: Pál Koppán , MAC
1902: Miksa Hellmich, OTE
1903: Béla Mező, MAC
1904: Béla Mező , MAC
1905: Zoltán Bertalan, MAC
1906: Miksa Hellmich , OTE
1907: Miksa Hellmich , OTE
1908: Pál Simon, MAC
1909: Pál Simon , MAC
1910: Vilmos Rácz, BEAC
1911: István Jankovich, MAC
1912: István Jankovich , MAC
1913: Pál Szalay, MTK
1914: József Szenes, MTK
 100 metres
1915: József Szenes , MTK
1916: Géza Krepuska, MAC
1917: Lajos Korunczy, TSE
1918: Géza Krepuska , MAC
1919: Géza Krepuska , MAC
1920: Géza Krepuska , MAC
1921: Ferenc Gerő, KAOE
1922: Ferenc Gerő , KAOE
1923: Ferenc Gerő , KAOE
1924: Ferenc Gerő , KAOE
1925: István Raggambi-Fluck, BBTE
1926: István Raggambi-Fluck , BBTE
1927: Bruno Malitz, Germany
1928: Ferenc Gerő , KAOE
1929: István Raggambi-Fluck , BBTE
1930: István Sugár, UTE
1931: Gyula Gyenes, MTK
1932: Gábor Gerő, MTK
1933: László Forgács, UTE
1934: József Sir, BBTE
1935: József Sir , BBTE
1936: Gyula Gyenes, MAC
1937: Gyula Gyenes , MAC
1938: Gyula Gyenes , MAC
1939: József Sir , BBTE
1940: Ferenc Szigetvári, PEAC
1941: György Csányi, UTE
1942: Ferenc Tima, KEAC
1943: Pál Pelsőczy, MAC
1944: Ferenc Bánhalmi, MRTSE
1945: György Csányi , UTE
1946: Ferenc Tima , SzEAC
1947: Béla Goldoványi, MAFC
1948: György Csányi , UTE
1949: György Csányi , UTE
1950: Ottó Szebeni, Textiles
1951: Géza Varasdi, Budapest
1952: Béla Goldoványi, Dózsa SE
1953: Béla Goldoványi , Budapest
1954: Béla Goldoványi , Dózsa SE
1955: Béla Goldoványi , Bp. Építők
1956: Géza Varasdi , Csepeli Vasas
1957: Sándor Jakabfy, BEAC
1958: Béla Goldoványi , Bp. Építők
1959: László Kiss, Tatabányai Bányász
1960: László Kiss , Tatabányai Bányász
1961: Csaba Csutorás, Bp. Honvéd
1962: Csaba Csutorás , Bp. Honvéd
1963: Csaba Csutorás , Bp. Honvéd
1964: Csaba Csutorás , Bp. Honvéd
1965: Huba Rozsnyai, MAFC
1966: László Mihályfi, BEAC
1967: László Mihályfi , BEAC
1968: Tibor Farkas, Bp. Honvéd
1969: László Mihályfi, BEAC
1970: Tibor Farkas, Bp. Honvéd
1971: Tibor Farkas , Bp. Honvéd
1972: István Bátori, Ú. Dózsa
1973: Lajos Gresa, GEAC
1974: Tibor Farkas , Bp. Honvéd
1975: Endre Lépold, PMSC
1976: Lajos Gresa , FTC
1977: Lajos Gresa , FTC
1978: István Nagy, Hevesi SE
1979: István Csatár, Bp. Honvéd
1980: Ferenc Kiss, Csepel
1981: Attila Kovács, Szekszárdi Dózsa
1982: István Nagy , Hevesi SE
1983: Ferenc Kiss , Csepel
1984: Attila Kovács , Ú. Dózsa
1985: Attila Kovács , Ú. Dózsa
1986: Attila Kovács , Ú. Dózsa
1987: Attila Kovács , Ú. Dózsa
1988: Attila Kovács , Ú. Dózsa
1989: Attila Kovács , Ú. Dózsa
1990: Attila Kovács , Ú. Dózsa
1991: Attila Kovács , Ú. Dózsa
1992: Attila Kovács , Ú. Dózsa
1993: Pál Rezák, UTE
1994: Attila Kovács , UTE
1995: Pál Rezák , UTE
1996: Szabolcs Alex, Vaker
1997: Gábor Dobos, Bp. Honvéd
1998: Gábor Dobos , Bp. Honvéd
1999: Gábor Dobos , Bp. Honvéd
2000: Gábor Dobos , Bp. Honvéd
2001: Viktor Kovács, Szolnoki MÁV
2002: Roland Németh, Soproni AC
2003: Gábor Dobos , Bp. Honvéd
2004: Géza Pauer, Bp. Honvéd
2005: Gábor Dobos , Bp. Honvéd
2006: Roland Németh , Soproni AC
2007: Roland Németh , FTC
2008: Gergely Németh, FTC
2009: Péter Miklós, Bp. Honvéd
2010: Dániel Karlik, KSI
2011: Dániel Karlik , KSI
2012: Miklós Szebeny, Vasas
2013: Roland Németh , MAC-Népstadion
2014: Dániel Karlik , GEAC
2015: Dániel Szabó, ARAK
2016: János Sipos, Szolnoki MÁV
2017: Dániel Szabó , ARAK
2018: Dániel Szabó , ARAK
2019: Dániel Szabó , ARAK

200 metres

 220 yards
1908: Pál Simon, MAC
1909: Pál Simon , MAC
1910: Frigyes Mezei, BEAC
1911: István Jankovich, MAC
1912: István Jankovich , MAC
1913: Pál Szalay, MTK
1914: Ervin Szerelemhegyi, MAC
 200 metres
1915: Ervin Szerelemhegyi , MAC
1916: Géza Krepuska, MAC
1917: Lajos Korunczy, TSE
1918: Géza Krepuska , MAC
1919: Géza Krepuska , MAC
1920: Géza Krepuska , MAC
1921: Lajos Korunczy , MTK
1922: Ferenc Gerő, KAOE
1923: Ferenc Gerő , KAOE
1924: Ferenc Gerő , KAOE
1925: Gusztáv Rózsahegyi, MAC
1926: Sándor Hajdú, FTC
1927: Bruno Malitz, Germany
1928: Ferenc Gerő , KAOE
1929: István Raggambi-Fluck, BBTE
1930: István Raggambi-Fluck , BBTE
1931: Gábor Gerő, MTK
1932: István Raggambi-Fluck , BBTE
1933: Gábor Gerő , MTK
1934: József Sir, BBTE
1935: József Sir , BBTE
1936: Gyula Gyenes, MAC
1937: Gyula Gyenes , MAC
1938: Gyula Gyenes , MAC
1939: József Sir , BBTE
1940: Gyula Gyenes , MAC
1941: György Csányi, UTE
1942: Gyula Gyenes , MAC
1943: Pál Pelsőczy, MAC
1944: László Ónody, Testvériség
1945: György Csányi , UTE
1946: Ferenc Tima, SZEAC
1947: Béla Goldoványi, MAFC
1948: Egon Solymosi, PVSK
1949: György Csányi , UTE
1950: Ottó Szebeni, Textiles
1951: Zoltán Adamik, Budapest
1952: Béla Goldoványi , Dózsa SE
1953: Béla Goldoványi , Budapest
1954: Béla Goldoványi , Dózsa SE
1955: Béla Goldoványi , Bp. Építők
1956: Béla Goldoványi , Bp. Építők
1957: Béla Goldoványi , Bp. Építők
1958: Béla Goldoványi , Bp. Építők
1959: Csaba Csutorás, Bp. Honvéd
1960: Csaba Csutorás , Bp. Honvéd
1961: László Mihályfi, TFSE
1962: Csaba Csutorás , Bp. Honvéd
1963: László Mihályfi , TFSE
1964: Csaba Csutorás , Bp. Honvéd
1965: László Mihályfi , BEAC
1966: László Mihályfi , BEAC
1967: József Istóczky, Ú. Dózsa
1968: László Mihályfi , BEAC
1969: László Mihályfi , BEAC
1970: Tibor Farkas, Bp. Honvéd
1971: József Fügedi, Ú. Dózsa
1972: Gyula Magyar, Bp. Honvéd
1973: Tibor Farkas , Bp. Honvéd
1974: Tibor Farkas , Bp. Honvéd
1975: László Lukács, PMSC
1976: Tibor Petőházi, Ajkai Alumínium
1977: István Nagy, Hevesi SE
1978: László Babály, Debreceni MVSC
1979: István Csatár, Bp. Honvéd
1980: István Nagy , Hevesi SE
1981: Ferenc Kiss, Csepel
1982: István Nagy ,  Hevesi SE
1983: István Nagy , Hevesi SE
1984: Attila Kovács, Ú. Dózsa
1985: István Nagy, Hevesi SE
1986: György Fetter, Bp. Spartacus
1987: Attila Kovács , Ú. Dózsa
1988: Attila Kovács , Ú. Dózsa
1989: Tamás Molnár, NYVSSC
1990: László Karaffa, Bp. Honvéd
1991: Attila Kovács , Ú. Dózsa
1992: László Karaffa, Bp. Honvéd
1993: Pál Rezák, UTE
1994: Pál Rezák , UTE
1995: László Karaffa , Bp. Honvéd
1996: György Dobos, UTE
1997: Miklós Gyulai, Bp. Honvéd
1998: Miklós Gyulai , NYVSC
1999: Roland Németh, Soproni SI
2000: Gábor Dobos, Bp. Honvéd
2001: Zsolt Szeglet, Győri Dózsa
2002: Zsolt Szeglet , Győri Dózsa
2003: Géza Pauer, Bp. Honvéd
2004: Géza Pauer , Bp. Honvéd
2005: Roland Németh , Soproni AC
2006: Miklós Szebeny, Vasas
2007: Péter Miklós, Bp. Honvéd
2008: Gábor Pásztor, FTC
2009: Balázs Baji, Békéscsabai AC
2010: Gábor Pásztor , FTC
2011: Tibor Kása, Haladás
2012: Tibor Kása , Haladás
2013: Győző Móré, GEAC
2014: Bálint Móricz, Haladás
2015: Bálint Móricz , Haladás
2016: János Sipos, Szolnoki MÁV
2017: László Szabó, FTC
2018: László Szabó , FTC
2019: Bence Boros, Szolnoki MÁV

400 metres

 440 yards
1896: Alajos Szokolyi, MAC
1897: Pál Koppán, MUE
1898: István Záborszky, MAC
1899: Ernő Schubert, MUE
1900: Ernő Schubert (2), MUE
1901: , OTE
1902: , 
1903: , 
1904: , 
1905: , 
1906: , 
1907: , 
1908: , 
1909: , 
1910: , 
1911: , 
1912: , 
1913: , 
1914: , 
 400 metres
1915: , 
1916: , 
1917: , 
1918: , 
1919: , 
1920: , 
1921: , 
1922: , 
1923: , 
1924: , 
1925: , 
1926: , 
1927: , 
1928: , 
1929: , 
1930: , 
1931: , 
1932: , 
1933: , 
1934: , 
1935: , 
1936: , 
1937: , 
1938: , 
1939: , 
1940: , 
1941: , 
1942: , 
1943: , 
1944: , 
1945: , 
1946: , 
1947: , 
1948: , 
1949: , 
1950: , 
1951: , 
1952: , 
1953: , 
1954: , 
1955: , 
1956: , 
1957: , 
1958: , 
1959: , 
1960: István Korda
1961: István Korda
1962: Csaba Csutorás
1963: István Gyulai
1964: István Gyulai
1965: László Mihályfi
1966: István Gyulai
1967: László Mihályfi
1968: László Mihályfi
1969: István Rózsa
1970: István Rózsa
1971: József Fügedi
1972: István Rózsa
1973: István Rózsa
1974: István Rózsa
1975: István Rózsa
1976: Nándor Hornyacsek
1977: Nándor Hornyacsek
1978: Nándor Hornyacsek
1979: András Paróczai
1980: András Paróczai
1981: Sándor Újhelyi
1982: Sándor Újhelyi
1983: Sándor Újhelyi
1984: Gusztáv Menczer
1985: Gusztáv Menczer
1986: Gusztáv Menczer
1987: Tamás Molnár
1988: Tamás Molnár
1989: Tamás Molnár
1990: Ervin Katona
1991: Tamás Molnár
1992: Tamás Molnár
1993: Gusztáv Menczer
1994: Gábor Kiss
1995: Dusán Kovács
1996: Tibor Szél
1997: Péter Nyilasi
1998: Péter Nyilasi
1999: Zsolt Szeglet
2000: Attila Kilvinger
2001: Zsolt Szeglet
2002: Zsolt Szeglet
2003: Zsolt Szeglet
2004: Zsolt Szeglet
2005: Zoltán Borsányi
2006: Balázs Molnár
2007: , 
2008: , 
2009: , 
2010: , 
2011: , 
2012: , 
2013: , 
2014: , 
2015: , 
2016: , 
2017: , 
2018: , 
2019: ,

800 metres

 880 yard
1904: József Nagy, BAK
1905: József Nagy , BAK
1906: Ödön Bodor, BPTTSE
1907: Rezső Holics, BEAC
1908: József Nagy , BBTE
1909: Ödön Bodor , BPTTSE
1910: Ödön Bodor , BPTTSE
1911: Ödön Bodor , BPTTSE
1912: Ödön Bodor , BPTTSE
1913: Ferenc Rajz, MTK
1914: György Mickler, MTK
 800 metres
1915: István Déván, MAC
1916: József Bognár, MTE
1917: Jenő Németh, FTC
1918: István Grósz, MTK
1919: János Benedek, BEAC
1920: János Benedek , BEAC
...
1960: Péter Parsch
1961: Lajos Szentgáli
1962: Péter Parsch
1963: Péter Parsch
1964: János Aradi
1965: János Aradi
1966: Lóránd Stoll
1967: Imre Nagy
1968: Róbert Honti
1969: György Molnár
1970: András Zsinka
1971: György Molnár
1972: Sándor Fekete
1973: Sándor Fekete
1974: András Zsinka
1975: András Paróczai
1976: András Zsinka
1977: János Zemen
1978: András Paróczai
1979: András Paróczai
1980: András Paróczai
1981: József Bereczki
1982: Sándor Paróczai
1983: Imre Ötvös
1984: Zsolt Szabó
1985: Zsolt Szabó
1986: Sándor Paróczai
1987: József Bereczki
1988: István Szalai
1989: Róbert Banai
1990: Róbert Banai
1991: Tibor Martina
1992: Róbert Banai
1993: Miklós Répási
1994: Miklós Répási
1995: Balázs Tölgyesi
1996: Balázs Tölgyesi
1997: Balázs Tölgyesi
1998: Balázs Korányi
1999: Balázs Korányi
2000: Balázs Korányi
2001: István Kerékjártó
2002: Balázs Tölgyesi
2003: István Kerékjártó
2004: István Kerékjártó
2005: Dávid Takács
2006: Dávid Takács

1500 metres

 1 mile
1896: František Horn, Bohemia
1897: Bohumil Rudl, Bohemia
1898: Felix Graf, Austria
1899: Hermann Wraschtil, Austria
1900: Hermann Wraschtil , Austria
1901: Ferenc Gillemot, MFC
1902: Pál Bredl, MAC
1903: József Nagy, MUE
1904: József Nagy , BAK
1905: Ödön Bodor, BPTTSE
1906: Ödön Bodor , BPTTSE
1907: Imre Veres, MAC
1908: Ödön Bodor , BPTTSE
1909: József Nagy , BBTE
1910: Ödön Bodor , BPTTSE
1911: János Antal, MAC
1912: Ferenc Forgács, BEAC
1913: Ferenc Forgács , BEAC
1914: Teofil Savniky, MTK
 1500 metres
1915: , MTE
1916: , MTE
1917: , FTC
1918: , MTK
1919: , MTE
1920: , MTK
...
1960: István Rózsavölgyi
1961: Lajos Szentgáli
1962: Péter Parsch
1963: Péter Parsch
1964: György Kiss
1965: György Kiss
1966: István Jóny
1967: György Kiss
1968: Róbert Honti
1969: János Török
1970: Péter Mohácsi
1971: György Molnár
1972: György Molnár
1973: János Török
1974: János Zemen
1975: János Zemen
1976: János Zemen
1977: János Zemen
1978: László Kispál
1979: János Hrenek
1980: István Lajkó
1981: Imre Deák-Nagy
1982: Attila Syulok
1983: László Tóth
1984: József Búcsúházi
1985: Gábor Szabó
1986: Gábor Szabó
1987: István Knipl
1988: Róbert Banai
1989: Róbert Banai
1990: Róbert Banai
1991: Róbert Banai
1992: Róbert Banai
1993: Róbert Banai
1994: Róbert Banai
1995: Balázs Tölgyesi
1996: Balázs Tölgyesi
1997: Balázs Tölgyesi
1998: Balázs Tölgyesi
1999: Balázs Tölgyesi
2000: Balázs Tölgyesi
2001: Balázs Csillag
2002: Béla Horváth II
2003: Olivér Bodor
2004: Balázs Csillag
2005: Gábor Csaja
2006: Barnabás Bene

5000 metres

 3 miles
1906: Gyula Gál, BAK
1907: Arnošt Nejedlý, Bohemia
1908: Antal Lovas, MTK
1909: Antonín Dvořák , Bohemia
1910: Mihály Váradi, BEAC
1911: Felix Kwieton, Austria
1912: Mihály Váradi , BEAC
1913: Ferenc Forgács, BEAC
1914: Mihály Váradi , BEAC
 5000 metres
1915: Vince Vörös, MTE
1916: János Kaiser, MTE
1917: Miklós Körmendi, MTK
1918: József Bese, MTE
1919: Vince Vörös , MTE
1920: Mihály Váradi , BEAC
...
1960: Sándor Iharos
1961: Sándor Iharos
1962: György Kiss
1963: János Pintér
1964: Lajos Mecser
1965: Dénes Simon
1966: Lajos Mecser
1967: György Kiss
1968: Lajos Mecser
1969: János Török
1970: Lajos Mecser
1971: János Török
1972: Péter Mohácsi
1973: Gábor Báthori
1974: János Török
1975: Dániel Sietõ
1976: László Kispál
1977: László Kispál
1978: László Kispál
1979: László Tóth
1980: László Kispál
1981: József Májer
1982: László Szász
1983: Gábor Szabó
1984: Gábor Markó
1985: Tamás Szabó
1986: Gábor Szabó
1987: Zoltán Kadlóth
1988: Tibor Velczenbach
1989: Zoltán Káldy
1990: 
1991: Gábor Markó
1992: Zoltán Káldy
1993: Zoltán Káldy
1994: Imre Berkovics
1995: Zoltán Káldy
1996: Zoltán Káldy
1997: Tamás Kliszek
1998: Tamás Kliszek
1999: János Szemán
2000: Imre Berkovics
2001: Balázs Csillag
2002: Olivér Bodor
2003: Olivér Bodor
2004: Balázs Csillag
2005: Barnabás Bene
2006: Barnabás Bene

10,000 metres

1930: , Soroksári AC
1931: , Soroksári AC
1932: , MTK
1933: , Vasas
1934: , MTK
1935: , BBTE
...
1960: Sándor Iharos
1961: Miklós Szabó
1962: József Sütõ
1963: József Sütõ
1964: Lajos Mecser
1965: Lajos Mecser
1966: Lajos Mecser
1967: György Kiss
1968: János Szerényi
1969: Dénes Simon
1970: Lajos Mecser
1971: Lajos Mecser
1972: Béla Tóth
1973: Béla Tóth
1974: András Fancsali
1975: Péter Mohácsi
1976: András Fancsali
1977: István Kerékjártó
1978: István Kerékjártó
1979: Miklós Golács
1980: József Májer
1981: István Kerékjártó
1982: Béla Horváth
1983: József Májer
1984: József Májer
1985: Gábor Markó
1986: Gábor Szabó
1987: Zoltán Káldy
1988: Zoltán Kadlóth
1989: Zoltán Káldy
1990: Zoltán Káldy
1991: Zoltán Káldy
1992: Zoltán Káldy
1993: Zoltán Káldy
1994: Tamás Kliszek
1995: Zoltán Káldy
1996: Zoltán Káldy
1997: Zoltán Káldy
1998: Tamás Kliszek
1999: Imre Berkovics
2000: Ferenc Sági
2001: Miklós Zatykó
2002: Máté Németh
2003: Olivér Bodor
2004: Barnabás Bene
2005: Barnabás Bene
2006: Barnabás Bene

10K run

2014: , Békéscsabai AC
2015: , Békéscsabai AC
2016: , BEAC
2017: , Debreceni SC
2018: , Psn Zrt.
2019: , KARC

Half marathon

1992: János Szemán
1993: Péter Jáger
1994: Péter Jáger
1995: Zoltán Káldy
1996: Zoltán Káldy
1997: Tamás Kliszek
1998: Zsolt Bácskai
1999: Zsolt Bácskai
2000: Imre Berkovics
2001: Zsolt Benedek
2002: Zsolt Benedek
2003: Miklós Zatykó
2004: Tamás Tóth
2005: András Juhász

Marathon

1925: Pál Király, ESC
1926: Pál Király , ESC
1927: Pál Király , ESC
1928: József Galambos, KiSE
1929: István Zelenka, SBTC
1930: József Galambos , ESC
1931: József Galambos , ESC
1932: József Galambos , ESC
1933: József Galambos , ESC
1934: József Gyetvay, SzVSE
...
1960: József Dobronyi
1961: Zoltán Kovács
1962: Béla Szalay
1963: József Sütõ
1964: József Sütõ
1965: József Sütõ
1966: Gyula Tóth
1967: Gyula Tóth
1968: Gyula Tóth
1969: Gyula Tóth
1970: Gyula Tóth
1971: Imre Berkovics
1972: Gyula Tóth
1973: Ferenc Szekeres
1974: Ferenc Szekeres
1975: Ferenc Szekeres
1976: György Sinkó
1977: György Sinkó
1978: Ferenc Szekeres
1979: Ferenc Szekeres
1980: János Szekeres
1981: Ferenc Szekeres
1982: Ferenc Szekeres
1983: Zoltán Kiss
1984: Zoltán Kiss
1985: Attila Bauer
1986: István Kerékjártó
1987: János Papp
1988: Gábor Szabó
1989: Csaba Szûcs
1990: Csaba Szûcs
1991: János Papp
1992: Zoltán Holba
1993: Zoltán Holba
1994: Zoltán Holba
1995: Zoltán Holba
1996: Endre Laczfi
1997: Márton Lajtos
1998: Gergely Rezessy
1999: Gergely Rezessy
2000: János Szemán
2001: Antal Szûcs
2002: Gergely Rezessy
2003: László Nagy
2004: Roland Ádók
2005: Miklós Zatykó
2006: Gergely Rezessy

110 metres hurdles

 120 yards hurdles
1901: , BEAC
1902: , BBTE
1903: , BBTE
1904: , BEAC
1905: , BBTE
1906: , UTE
1907: , UTE
1908: , BBTE
1909: , BBTE
1910: , BBTE
1911: , BBTE
1912: , FTC
1913: , BEAC
1914: , FTC
 110 metres hurdles
1915: , FTC
1916: , FTC
1917: , MAC
1918: , MAC
1919: , MAC
1920: , MAC
...
1960: Imre Retezár
1961: Imre Retezár
1962: Imre Retezár
1963: Zoltán Csányi
1964: Miklós Fluck
1965: Béla Mélykuti
1966: Béla Mélykuti
1967: Béla Mélykuti
1968: Béla Mélykuti
1969: Béla Mélykuti
1970: Béla Mélykuti
1971: Lóránd Milassin
1972: Lóránd Milassin
1973: Lóránd Milassin
1974: László Bognár
1975: Lóránd Milassin
1976: Lóránd Milassin
1977: Lóránd Milassin
1978: Lóránd Milassin
1979: Attila Bartha
1980: György Bakos
1981: György Bakos
1982: György Bakos
1983: György Bakos
1984: György Bakos
1985: György Bakos
1986: György Bakos
1987: György Bakos
1988: György Bakos
1989: György Bakos
1990: György Bakos
1991: György Bakos
1992: Lajos Sárközi
1993: Levente Csillag
1994: Levente Csillag
1995: Levente Csillag
1996: Levente Csillag
1997: Levente Csillag
1998: Gergely Palágyi
1999: Levente Csillag
2000: Levente Csillag
2001: Levente Csillag
2002: Levente Csillag
2003: Balázs Kovács
2004: Levente Csillag
2005: Dániel Kiss
2006: Dániel Kiss

200 metres hurdles

1960: István Munkácsi
1961: István Munkácsi
1962: Imre Retezár
1963: Zoltán Csányi

400 metres hurdles

1920: , MTK
1921: , BEAC
1922: , MAC
1923: , MAC
1924: , MAC
1925: , MAC
...
1960: István Munkácsi
1961: István Munkácsi
1962: László Török
1963: Miklós Vértesy
1964: János Benkõ
1965: Miklós Vértesy
1966: Ferenc Oros
1967: Zsolt Ringhofer
1968: Zsolt Ringhofer
1969: Zsolt Ringhofer
1970: István Kövesdi
1971: István Árva
1972: István Árva
1973: István Árva
1974: István Árva
1975: István Árva
1976: János Aradi
1977: István Árva
1978: István Kövesdi
1979: József Szalai
1980: József Szalai
1981: István Simon-Balla
1982: István Simon-Balla
1983: István Takács
1984: József Szalai
1985: István Takács
1986: István Simon-Balla
1987: Róbert Bágyi
1988: István Simon-Balla
1989: István Simon-Balla
1990: Róbert Bágyi
1991: Róbert Bágyi
1992: Dusán Kovács
1993: Dusán Kovács
1994: Dusán Kovács
1995: Dusán Kovács
1996: Dusán Kovács
1997: Dusán Kovács
1998: Tibor Bédi
1999: Tibor Bédi
2000: Tibor Bédi
2001: Dusán Kovács
2002: Dusán Kovács
2003: Ákos Dezsõ
2004: Ákos Dezsõ
2005: Ákos Dezsõ
2006: Balázs Molnár

3000 metres steeplechase

1938: , UTE
1939: , UTE
1940: , BBTE
1941: , BBTE
1942: , Testvériség
1943: , V.MOVE
...
1960: Gerhart Hecker
1961: Attila Simon
1962: Miklós Fazekas
1963: József Mácsár
1964: Attila Simon
1965: Miklós Fazekas
1966: István Jóny
1967: István Jóny
1968: József Pamuki
1969: István Jóny
1970: Sándor Máthé
1971: István Jóny
1972: Balázs Hazai
1973: Sándor Máthé
1974: Gyula Németh
1975: János Mester
1976: László Kocsis
1977: László Kocsis
1978: László Kocsis
1979: Gábor Markó
1980: Gyula Balogh
1981: István Szénégetõ
1982: Gábor Markó
1983: Gábor Markó
1984: Gábor Markó
1985: Béla Vágó
1986: Gábor Markó
1987: Béla Vágó
1988: Béla Vágó
1989: Béla Vágó
1990: Gábor Markó
1991: Gábor Markó
1992: Béla Vágó
1993: Gábor Markó
1994: Béla Vágó
1995: Béla Vágó
1996: Róbert Banai
1997: Róbert Banai
1998: Sándor Serfõzõ
1999: Levente Tímár
2000: Levente Tímár
2001: Máté Németh
2002: Máté Németh
2003: Máté Németh
2004: Levente Tímár
2005: Albert Minczér
2006: Balázs Ott

High jump

1960: Sándor Noszály
1961: Sándor Noszály
1962: János Medovarszki
1963: János Medovarszki
1964: János Medovarszki
1965: János Medovarszki
1966: János Medovarszki
1967: Sándor Noszály
1968: Sándor Noszály
1969: József Tihányi
1970: Endre Kelemen
1971: Endre Kelemen
1972: Ádám Szepesi
1973: István Major
1974: Endre Kelemen
1975: Endre Kelemen
1976: István Major
1977: István Major
1978: István Major
1979: István Széles
1980: Zoltán Társi
1981: István Széles
1982: Tibor Gerstenbrein
1983: István Gibicsár
1984: István Gibicsár
1985: István Gibicsár
1986: Gyula Németh
1987: Ferenc Pál
1988: Benõ Bese
1989: Gyula Németh
1990: Benõ Bese
1991: András Tresch
1992: Péter Deutsch
1993: Péter Deutsch
1994: Zoltán Bakler
1995: Péter Deutsch
1996: István Kovács
1997: István Kovács
1998: Attila Zsivoczky
1999: Gergely Bata
2000: Román Fehér
2001: Román Fehér
2002: Román Fehér
2003: László Boros
2004: László Boros
2005: László Boros
2006: László Boros

Pole vault

1960: János Miskei
1961: János Miskei
1962: János Horváth
1963: István Tamás
1964: Endre Gagyi
1965: János Miskei
1966: János Miskei
1967: Ágoston Schulek
1968: Ágoston Schulek
1969: Ágoston Schulek
1970: Mihály Kalmár
1971: Róbert Steinhacker
1972: Róbert Steinhacker
1973: Károly Viskovics
1974: Mihály Kalmár
1975: Róbert Steinhacker
1976: János Veisz
1977: Ernõ Makó
1978: János Veisz
1979: László Franke
1980: József Novobáczky
1981: László Fülöp
1982: Ferenc Salbert
1983: Ferenc Salbert
1984: Ferenc Salbert
1985: Ernõ Makó
1986: Gábor Molnár
1987: Dezsõ Szabó
1988: István Bagyula
1989: István Bagyula
1990: Dezsõ Szabó
1991: Zoltán Farkas
1992: Dezsõ Szabó
1993: Pál Rohánszky
1994: István Bagyula
1995: István Bagyula
1996: Dezsõ Szabó
1997: Ferenc László
1998: István Bagyula
1999: Ferenc László
2000: Dezsõ Szabó
2001: Dezsõ Szabó
2002: Péter Kovács
2003: János Váczi
2004: János Váczi
2005: Péter Skoumal
2006: Zoltán Szörényi

Long jump

1960: Henrik Kalocsai
1961: Henrik Kalocsai
1962: Henrik Kalocsai
1963: Henrik Kalocsai
1964: Béla Margitics
1965: Henrik Kalocsai
1966: Henrik Kalocsai
1967: Henrik Kalocsai
1968: Béla Margitics
1969: Henrik Kalocsai
1970: Henrik Kalocsai
1971: Henrik Kalocsai
1972: Gábor Katona
1973: Henrik Kalocsai
1974: Gyula Németh
1975: Gyula Németh
1976: Tibor Kövesi
1977: Tibor Parti
1978: László Szalma
1979: Béla Bakosi
1980: László Szalma
1981: László Szalma
1982: László Szalma
1983: László Szalma
1984: Gyula Pálóczi
1985: László Szalma
1986: Gyula Pálóczi
1987: Zsolt Szabó
1988: László Szalma
1989: Csaba Almási
1990: Gyula Pálóczi
1991: Csaba Almási
1992: Csaba Almási
1993: Tibor Ordina
1994: János Uzsoki
1995: Tibor Ordina
1996: Tibor Ordina
1997: János Uzsoki
1998: Tibor Ordina
1999: János Uzsoki
2000: Balázs Dömötör
2001: Tamás Margl
2002: Imre Lõrincz
2003: Imre Lõrincz
2004: Tamás Margl
2005: Pál Babicz
2006: Imre Lõrincz

Triple jump

1960: Róbert Németh
1961: Gyula Czapulai
1962: Henrik Kalocsai
1963: Henrik Kalocsai
1964: Drágán Ivanov
1965: Henrik Kalocsai
1966: Drágán Ivanov
1967: Henrik Kalocsai
1968: Henrik Kalocsai
1969: Zoltán Cziffra
1970: Henrik Kalocsai
1971: Henrik Kalocsai
1972: Gábor Katona
1973: Henrik Kalocsai
1974: Zoltán Cziffra
1975: Zoltán Cziffra
1976: Gábor Katona
1977: Gábor Katona
1978: Gábor Katona
1979: Béla Bakosi
1980: Béla Bakosi
1981: Béla Bakosi
1982: Béla Bakosi
1983: Gábor Katona
1984: Béla Bakosi
1985: Béla Bakosi
1986: Béla Bakosi
1987: Béla Bakosi
1988: Gyula Pálóczi
1989: Gyula Pálóczi
1990: Gyula Pálóczi
1991: Tamás Olasz
1992: Zsolt Czingler
1993: Gyula Pálóczi
1994: Gyula Pálóczi
1995: Zsolt Czingler
1996: Zsolt Czingler
1997: Zsolt Czingler
1998: Zsolt Czingler
1999: Zsolt Czingler
2000: Zsolt Czingler
2001: Péter Tölgyesi
2002: Péter Tölgyesi
2003: Péter Tölgyesi
2004: Péter Tölgyesi
2005: János Farkas
2006: Péter Tölgyesi

Shot put

1960: Vilmos Varjú
1961: Zsigmond Nagy
1962: Zsigmond Nagy
1963: Vilmos Varjú
1964: Vilmos Varjú
1965: Vilmos Varjú
1966: Vilmos Varjú
1967: Vilmos Varjú
1968: Vilmos Varjú
1969: Vilmos Varjú
1970: Vilmos Varjú
1971: Vilmos Varjú
1972: Vilmos Varjú
1973: János Faragó
1974: György Nagy
1975: János Faragó
1976: János Faragó
1977: János Faragó
1978: László Szabó
1979: László Szabó
1980: István Kácsor
1981: István Kácsor
1982: István Kácsor
1983: László Szabó
1984: László Szabó
1985: Zsigmond Ladányi
1986: László Szabó
1987: Zsigmond Ladányi
1988: László Szabó
1989: Jenõ Kóczián
1990: Jenõ Kóczián
1991: József Ficsor
1992: Jenõ Kóczián
1993: Jenõ Kóczián
1994: Jenõ Kóczián
1995: Jenõ Kóczián
1996: Jenõ Kóczián
1997: Jenõ Kóczián
1998: Attila Pintér
1999: Szilárd Kiss
2000: Zsolt Bíber
2001: Szilárd Kiss
2002: Szilárd Kiss
2003: Zsolt Bíber
2004: Zsolt Bíber
2005: Zsolt Bíber
2006: Lajos Kürthy

Discus throw

1960: József Szécsényi
1961: József Szécsényi
1962: József Szécsényi
1963: József Szécsényi
1964: Géza Fejér
1965: József Szécsényi
1966: Géza Fejér
1967: Géza Fejér
1968: Ferenc Tégla
1969: Ferenc Tégla
1970: Ferenc Tégla
1971: Géza Fejér
1972: Géza Fejér
1973: Géza Fejér
1974: János Murányi
1975: Géza Fejér
1976: Ferenc Tégla
1977: Ferenc Tégla
1978: János Faragó
1979: Géza Fejér
1980: Ferenc Szegletes
1981: Ferenc Szegletes
1982: Ferenc Csiszár
1983: Ferenc Csiszár
1984: Ferenc Tégla
1985: Csaba Holló
1986: Csaba Holló
1987: Attila Horváth
1988: József Ficsor
1989: József Ficsor
1990: Attila Horváth
1991: Attila Horváth
1992: Attila Horváth
1993: Attila Horváth
1994: Attila Horváth
1995: Attila Horváth
1996: Attila Horváth
1997: Attila Horváth
1998: Róbert Fazekas
1999: Roland Varga
2000: Róbert Fazekas
2001: Zoltán Kővágó
2002: Róbert Fazekas
2003: Róbert Fazekas
2004: Zoltán Kővágó
2005: Zoltán Kővágó
2006: Roland Varga

Hammer throw

1960: Gyula Zsivótzky
1961: Gyula Zsivótzky
1962: Gyula Zsivótzky
1963: Gyula Zsivótzky
1964: Gyula Zsivótzky
1965: Gyula Zsivótzky
1966: Gyula Zsivótzky
1967: Gyula Zsivótzky
1968: Gyula Zsivótzky
1969: Gyula Zsivótzky
1970: Gyula Zsivótzky
1971: István Encsi
1972: Sándor Eckschmiedt
1973: István Encsi
1974: István Encsi
1975: István Encsi
1976: Gábor Tamás
1977: Gábor Tamás
1978: Gábor Tamás
1979: Gábor Tamás
1980: Gábor Tamás
1981: Gábor Tamás
1982: Tibor Tánczi
1983: Tibor Tánczi
1984: Imre Szitás
1985: Imre Szitás
1986: Tibor Gécsek
1987: Tibor Gécsek
1988: Tibor Gécsek
1989: Tibor Gécsek
1990: Tibor Gécsek
1991: Tibor Gécsek
1992: Tibor Gécsek
1993: Tibor Gécsek
1994: Tibor Gécsek
1995: Balázs Kiss
1996: Adrián Annus
1997: Zsolt Németh
1998: Balázs Kiss
1999: Tibor Gécsek
2000: Balázs Kiss
2001: Tibor Gécsek
2002: Adrián Annus
2003: Adrián Annus
2004: Adrián Annus
2005: Krisztián Pars
2006: Krisztián Pars

Javelin throw

1960: Gergely Kulcsár
1961: Sándor Krasznai
1962: Gergely Kulcsár
1963: Gergely Kulcsár
1964: Gergely Kulcsár
1965: Gergely Kulcsár
1966: Gergely Kulcsár
1967: Gergely Kulcsár
1968: Gergely Kulcsár
1969: Gergely Kulcsár
1970: József Csík
1971: Gergely Kulcsár
1972: József Csík
1973: Miklós Németh
1974: György Erdélyi
1975: Ferenc Paragi
1976: Ferenc Paragi
1977: Ferenc Paragi
1978: Sándor Boros
1979: Ferenc Paragi
1980: Miklós Németh
1981: Miklós Németh
1982: Ferenc Paragi
1983: Miklós Németh
1984: András Temesi
1985: András Temesi
1986: Tamás Bolgár
1987: László Stefán
1988: Attila Bareith
1989: László Stefán
1990: Ferenc Knausz
1991: László Palotai
1992: Lajos Varga
1993: József Belák
1994: József Belák
1995: József Belák
1996: József Belák
1997: József Belák
1998: József Belák
1999: Gergely Horváth
2000: Gergely Horváth
2001: Gergely Horváth
2002: Gergely Horváth
2003: Gergely Horváth
2004: Gergely Horváth
2005: Gergely Horváth
2006: Csongor Olteán

Decathlon

1960: Gyula Hubai
1961: Gyula Hubai
1962: Gyula Hubai
1963: József Bakai
1964: Gyula Hubai
1965: Gyula Hubai
1966: József Bakai
1967: József Bakai
1968: Tibor Raáb
1969: József Bakai
1970: József Bakai
1971: József Bakai
1972: József Bakai
1973: Tibor Raáb
1974: Tibor Raáb
1975: Dániel Czabán
1976: Árpád Kiss
1977: Árpád Kiss
1978: Árpád Kiss
1979: Árpád Kiss
1980: László Nagy
1981: Árpád Kiss
1982: József Hoffer
1983: József Hoffer
1984: József Hoffer
1985: Béla Vágó
1986: Béla Vágó
1987: Dezsõ Szabó
1988: Dezsõ Szabó
1989: Dezsõ Szabó
1990: Dezsõ Szabó
1991: Dezsõ Szabó
1992: Sándor Munkácsi
1993: Sándor Munkácsi
1994: Zsolt Kürtösi
1995: Sándor Munkácsi
1996: Márk Váczi
1997: Sándor Munkácsi
1998: Zsolt Kürtösi
1999: Viktor Kovács
2000: Zsolt Kürtösi
2001: Tamás Polonyi
2002: Zsolt Kürtösi
2003: Zsolt Kürtösi
2004: Zsolt Kürtösi
2005: Péter Skoumal

20 kilometres walk
The course of the 1965 20 km championship race was short of the full distance.

1960: Tibor Balajcza
1961: Tibor Balajcza
1962: Antal Kiss
1963: István Havasi
1964: Antal Kiss
1965: János Dalmati
1966: István Göri
1967: Antal Kiss
1968: Andor Antal
1969: János Dalmati
1970: János Dalmati
1971: Andor Antal
1972: Andor Antal
1973: Sándor Fórián
1974: Sándor Fórián
1975: Imre Sztankovics
1976: Imre Sztankovics
1977: László Sátor
1978: Imre Sztankovics
1979: János Szálas
1980: László Sátor
1981: János Szálas
1982: László Sátor
1983: János Szálas
1984: János Szálas
1985: János Szálas
1986: Sándor Urbanik
1987: Sándor Urbanik
1988: Sándor Urbanik
1989: Sándor Urbanik
1990: Sándor Urbanik
1991: Sándor Urbanik
1992: Sándor Urbanik
1993: Sándor Urbanik
1994: Sándor Urbanik
1995: Sándor Urbanik
1996: Gyula Dudás
1997: Gyula Dudás
1998: Gyula Dudás
1999: Gyula Dudás
2000: Sándor Urbanik
2001: Sándor Urbanik
2002: Zoltán Czukor
2003: Gyula Dudás
2004: Gyula Dudás
2005: Gyula Dudás
2006: Gyula Dudás

50 kilometres walk

1960: Béla Dinesz
1961: István Havasi
1962: Béla Dinesz
1963: István Havasi
1964: István Havasi
1965: Antal Kiss
1966: István Havasi
1967: Antal Kiss
1968: István Havasi
1969: István Havasi
1970: János Dalmati
1971: János Dalmati
1972: János Dalmati
1973: Ferenc Danovszky
1974: Csaba Grandpierre
1975: Ferenc Danovszky
1976: Ferenc Danovszky
1977: László Sátor
1978: László Sátor
1979: László Sátor
1980: László Sátor
1981: László Sátor
1982: Miklós Domján
1983: László Sátor
1984: László Sátor
1985: László Sátor
1986: Rudolf Veréb
1987: Endre Andrásfai
1988: László Sátor
1989: László Sátor
1990: László Sátor
1991: Gyula Dudás
1992: Károly Kirszt
1993: Gyula Dudás
1994: Gyula Dudás
1995: Gyula Dudás
1996: Sándor Urbanik
1997: Gyula Dudás
1998: Zoltán Czukor
1999: Zoltán Czukor
2000: Zoltán Czukor
2001: Sándor Urbanik
2002: Zoltán Czukor
2003: Zoltán Czukor
2004: Zoltán Czukor
2005: János Tóth
2006: Zoltán Czukor

Cross country (long course)

1960: Miklós Szabó
1961: Miklós Szabó
1962: János Huszár
1963: József Sütõ
1964: Lajos Mecser
1965: Lajos Mecser
1966: Lajos Mecser
1967: Lajos Mecser
1968: Lajos Mecser
1969: Lajos Mecser
1970: Lajos Mecser
1971: Lajos Mecser
1972: Béla Tóth
1973: Lajos Mecser
1974: Lajos Mecser
1975: Lajos Mecser
1976: János Török
1977: István Kerékjártó
1978: János Török
1979: László Kispál
1980: István Kerékjártó
1981: István Kerékjártó
1982: István Kerékjártó
1983: István Kerékjártó
1984: József Májer
1985: Gábor Szabó
1986: Gábor Szabó
1987: Zoltán Kiss
1988: Zoltán Kadlót
1989: Zoltán Káldy
1990: György Markó
1991: Zoltán Káldy
1992: Imre Berkovics
1993: Imre Berkovics
1994: Imre Berkovics
1995: Imre Berkovics
1996: Zoltán Káldy
1997: Zoltán Káldy
1998: Zoltán Káldy
1999: András Juhász
2000: Zsolt Benedek
2001: Miklós Zatykó
2002: András Juhász
2003: Miklós Zatykó
2004: Miklós Zatykó
2005: Miklós Zatykó
2006: Barnabás Bene

Cross country (short course)

1960: Lajos Kovács
1961: Lajos Kovács
1962: Attila Simon
1963: Béla Szekeres
1964: György Kiss
1965: Attila Simon
1966: István Jóny
1967: János Szabó
1968: János Török
1969: Pál Játékos
1970: Nándor Varga
1971: János Török
1972: Jenõ Ita
1973: Péter Mohácsi
1974: János Török
1975: Not held
1976: Not held
1977: Not held
1978: Not held
1979: János Szekeres
1980: László Kispál
1981: Gábor Szabó
1982: Gábor Szabó
1983: Gábor Szabó
1984: Béla Énekes
1985: Attila Kozma
1986: József Orosz
1987: Gyula Sárközi
1988: István Knipl
1989: Gábor Szabó
1990: Róbert Banai
1991: József Bereczki
1992: 
1993: Ferenc Sági
1994: Ferenc Sági
1995: Not held
1996: Not held
1997: Not held
1998: Not held
1999: Not held
2000: Norbert Kõmuves
2001: Zsolt Benedek
2002: Máté Németh
2003: Olivér Bodor
2004: Tamás Tóth
2005: Balázs Csillag
2006: Barnabás Bene

4 × 100 metres relay

1920: BEAC
1921: KAOE
1922: KAOE
1923: KAOE
1924: KAOE
1925: KAOE
1926: KAOE
1927: KAOE
1928: KAOE
1929: BBTE
1930: BBTE
1931: BBTE
1932: BBTE
1933: BBTE
1934: BBTE
1935: BBTE
1936: BBTE
1937: BBTE
1938: BBTE
1939: BBTE
1940: BBTE
1941: BBTE
1942: BBTE
1943: BBTE

Multiple champions

100 metres

200 metres

References
List of Hungarian Athletics Championships winners (men) (in Hungarian)
Champions 1960–2006
Hungarian Championships. GBR Athletics. Retrieved 2021-04-18.

External links
Official website of the Hungarian Athletics Association (in Hungarian)

 List
Athletics Championships champions (men)
List
Hungarian